Yuji Iiyama (飯山 裕志, born July 13, 1979, in Ichikikushikino, Kagoshima) is a Japanese former professional baseball infielder and current coach for the Hokkaido Nippon-Ham Fighters in Japan's Nippon Professional Baseball. He played with the Fighters from 2001 to 2017, announcing his retirement in September 2017.

External links

NBP
Japanese Baseball Cards

1979 births
Hokkaido Nippon-Ham Fighters players
Japanese baseball players
Living people
Nippon Ham Fighters players
Nippon Professional Baseball infielders
Baseball people from Kagoshima Prefecture
Japanese baseball coaches
Nippon Professional Baseball coaches